Tommy Sotomayor (born Thomas Jerome Harris; 1975) is an American radio and internet talk show host, YouTube personality, conservative political commentator, men's rights activist and film producer.

Podcast controversy
In July 2016, a video from the night of the 2016 shooting of Dallas police officers showed two on-duty Dallas Police Department police officers calling fellow officers "cowards" on the podcast "Your World, My View Podcast" hosted by Sotomayor. The officers called into the podcast and, as their fellow officers were driving to the scene of the shooting and answering other police calls, the two North Dallas patrol officers drove around espousing controversial opinions about police shootings. "Quit hiring cowards, they are hiring cowards... my partner says they are hiring cowards," said one of them about rookie officers coming out of the police academy. "They are hiring ex-military and they don’t see people as human."

The Dallas Police Association later said the two officers were not a reflection of how other police officers feel and police department officials informed the media that Internal Affairs was investigating both officers. The video was later removed from YouTube and both officers remained on active duty but could have faced serious disciplinary action.

Media
In 2015, in Orting, Washington, former mayor and city Councilman Guy "Sam" Colorossi was placed under investigation after sending out a mass email containing a 14-minute video by Sotomayor that encouraged white officers to avoid policing black communities, an Orting black police officer complained about the video's content, which the city condemned as "offensive and deplorable." Sotomayor used racially charged language in the video and alluded to well-documented incidents in which white police officers were held accountable after clashing with black citizens in communities around the country. Colorossi later apologized. Orting Mayor Joachim Pestinger posted in response that Colorossi's email should have never been sent. Colorossi told The News Tribune he did not wish to offend anyone with the email and was passing it along for informational purposes.

In July 2016, Harry Houck, a CNN law enforcement analyst promoted a video by Sotomayor on Twitter that declared African Americans are responsible for most violent crime in the United States. In the video, Sotomayor claimed that black Americans are a more serious threat than guns. Houck, a retired NYPD detective, linked to Sotomayor’s video via Twitter, saying that the radio host "knows what he’s talking about!".

Sotomayor has also been a guest on the television news series On Point with Tomi Lahren on One America News Network and Blaze Media.

See also
 Black conservatism in the United States

References

External links

1975 births
Activists from Georgia (U.S. state)
African-American activists
African-American film producers
American film producers
American people of Panamanian descent
African-American radio personalities
American documentary film producers
American male journalists
American media personalities
American podcasters
American political activists
American political commentators
American social activists
American social commentators
American YouTubers
Living people
American conspiracy theorists
Black conservatism in the United States
Critics of multiculturalism
American Holocaust deniers
Male critics of feminism
Shock jocks
Men's rights activists
21st-century African-American people
20th-century African-American people